The largest cities in Europe according to the population within their city boundary have populations over 1 million inhabitants. Cities are sorted by official population. Capital cities are in bold. The list deals exclusively with the areas within city administrative boundaries as opposed to urban areas and metropolitan areas, which are generally larger in terms of population than the main city.

As some cities have very narrow boundaries and others very wide ones, the list may not give an accurate view of the comparative magnitude of different places, and the figures in the list should be treated with caution. For example Paris is the third most populous urban area in Europe, but the strict definition of the administrative limits of the City of Paris results in a far lower population shown in the table.

Largest cities

Map

See also

List of cities in the European Union by population within city limits
List of urban areas in Europe
List of metropolitan areas in Europe
List of urban areas in the European Union

Notes

References

Population